Clément Diop Degoud (born 13 October 1993) is a Senegalese footballer who plays for Atlanta United in Major League Soccer.

Career

Early career
Diop began his career with Amiens where he was a backup for three seasons, but never made a first team appearance. Diop was the starter of Amiens II, Amiens' reserve team for two seasons. Diop made his debut for Amiens II on 25 August 2012, against Calais RUFC, where he came a clean-sheet in a 1–0 win. Diop went on to keep clean-sheets in the following two matches, against Arras and SC Feignies.

LA Galaxy
On 20 March 2015, it was announced that Diop joined USL club LA Galaxy II for the 2015 season.  He made his debut for the club two days later in a 0–0 draw against Real Monarchs SLC. In the 2015 season Diop won the USL Western Conference and reached the USL Championship final with LA Galaxy II. In the finals against Rochester Rhinos, Diop was replaced by Bennett Sneddon late in extra-time. LA Galaxy II lost 2–1 in the final due to a late header from Asani Samuels.

On 16 December 2015, LA Galaxy announced that they had signed Diop to a first team contract for the forthcoming MLS season. On 14 June 2015, Diop made his debut for the first team in fourth round of the U.S. Open Cup against La Máquina FC, where the Galaxy won 4–1 in extra-time.

In Montréal
Diop moved to CF Montréal (known as the Montreal Impact at the time) via the MLS Waiver Draft following the 2017 season. He signed with the club on 9 January 2018. On 17 August 2021, Montréal and Diop mutually agreed to part ways.

Inter Miami
In January 2022, Diop signed a one-year contract with an option for a second year with Inter Miami, after having trained with the team since September 2021.

New England Revolution
On 5 August 2022, Diop was traded to New England Revolution in exchange for $125,000 in General Allocation Money. Following the 2022 season, New England opted to decline his contract option.

Atlanta United
On 11 January 2023, Diop signed with MLS side Atlanta United FC.

International career
Born in France and of Senegalese descent, Diop originally was called up to the youth national teams for France. Diop debuted for the Senegal national football team in a 0–0 friendly draw with Uganda on 5 June 2017.

Career statistics

Honours

Club

Montreal Impact
 Canadian Championship: 2019

Notes

References

External links

1993 births
Living people
Citizens of Senegal through descent
Senegalese footballers
Senegal international footballers
French footballers
French sportspeople of Senegalese descent
French expatriate footballers
French expatriate sportspeople in the United States
Amiens SC players
LA Galaxy II players
LA Galaxy players
CF Montréal players
Inter Miami CF players
New England Revolution players
Atlanta United FC players
Association football goalkeepers
Footballers from Paris
Expatriate soccer players in the United States
Expatriate soccer players in Canada
USL Championship players
Major League Soccer players